General elections were held in Liechtenstein on 15 July 1928, with a second round on 29 July. Early elections was called after Prince Johann II forced the resignation of the Christian-Social People's Party government of Prime Minister Gustav Schädler due to an embezzlement scandal at the National Bank of Liechtenstein. The result was a victory for the opposition Progressive Citizens' Party, which won 11 of the 15 seats in the Landtag.

Results

By electoral district

First round

Second round

References

Liechtenstein
1928 in Liechtenstein
Elections in Liechtenstein
July 1928 events
Election and referendum articles with incomplete results